Park Sung-woo (born June 7, 1988) is a South Korean actor and model. He is best known for his main role in I Have Three Boyfriends, Because It's My First Time and Oh! Dear Half-Basement Goddesses.

Biography and career
He was born on May 7, 1988 in Bucheon, Gyeonggi. He completed his studies from Sejong University. He made his debut as actor in 2010, he did a supporting role in film Pretty Romance. In 2011 he did again a supporting in film A Function and after two years, he did a lead role in short film High Fever in 2013 that gained him attention. In 2016 he starred in web drama, Unrequited Love playing a supporting role. He joined Produce 101, he was the oldest trainee on the show. He was a competitor on Produce 101 Season 2, he made it to ranked 37 in episode 8 but was eliminated. He then sang some songs on Produce 101 such as It's Me (Pick Me) in 2017. He was invited on Superman Family program he made his appearance in Remember Me and the same he was invited to variety show Kwang Seungjun's Coolkkadang. He signed with agency HIM Entertainment and he did modeling for different magazines and comerciales. He then starred in Crushes: Special Edition in 2017 playing a supporting role. He played his first lead role in web drama Oh! Dear Half-Basement Goddesses which attracted attention towards him. In 2018 he starred in drama Because It's My First Time by playing a lead role as Park Sung-woo he was praised for his acting. In 2019 he starred along Kim Ji-eun in drama I Have Three Boyfriends.

Filmography

Television

Film

References

External links 
 

1988 births
Living people
21st-century South Korean male actors
South Korean male models
South Korean male television actors
South Korean male film actors